Glyphipterix oxytricha is a moth in the  family Glyphipterigidae. It is known from South Africa.

References

Endemic moths of South Africa
Glyphipterigidae
Moths of Africa
Moths described in 1928